The Rochester Honkers are an amateur baseball team in the Northwoods League, a collegiate summer baseball league. Their home games are played at Mayo Field in Rochester, Minnesota. They have won the Northwoods League championship five times, most recently in 2009.

Andre Ethier of the Los Angeles Dodgers  was a Honker in 2002. In 2010, 22 of their players were drafted by organizations affiliated with Major League Baseball.

External links
 Rochester Honkers - official site
 Northwoods League - official site

1994 establishments in Minnesota
Amateur baseball teams in Minnesota
Northwoods League teams
Baseball teams established in 1994
Rochester, Minnesota